The Kwanlin Dün Cultural Centre  is a cultural centre of the Kwanlin Dün First Nation located in Whitehorse, Yukon, Canada. The centre opened in June 2012. The centre consists of a long house, artists studios, a gallery, classrooms, and an outdoor ceremonial space on the banks of the Yukon River. Attached to the Kwanlin Dün Cultural Centre, but serparate, is the Whitehorse Public Library. The centre hosts the Adäka Cultural Festival and the Shakaat Artist Residency  during summer months.

See also
Adäka Cultural Festival
MacBride Museum of Yukon History
Yukon Arts Centre

References

External links
 Kwanlin Dün Cultural Centre - Whitehorse, Yukon

Museums in Canada
Museums in Yukon